Lucretia is a 1500s drawing by Raphael, now in the collection of the Metropolitan Museum of Art.

Early history and creation
William Russell (died 1884) was the drawing's first recorded owner. Russell was the first to attribute the work to Raphael. Sir James Knowles purchased the drawing in 1908.

Description and interpretation
The work depicts Lucretia in the moment before she commits suicide by putting a dagger into her chest.

In its time printers would display images of Lucretia with Dido. Copies of the image have a Greek language inscription with it. The image is part of a contemporary style to depict females standing alone.

Later history and influence

The Metropolitan Museum of Art acquired the sketch in 1997.

References

Drawings of the Metropolitan Museum of Art

Raphael